Andriy Anatoliyovych Aksyonov (born February 2, 1971) is a member of the Verkhovna Rada, the national parliament of Ukraine. He joined the 9th Ukrainian Verkhovna Rada on May 19, 2021.

Biography 
He received higher education, he graduated from the Donetsk State Technical University.

Political career 
From 2008 - 2015 he was elected the Novodonetsk village head having gained 97% of the votes. In 2015-2020 he was the head of the town Dobropillya having gained 69% of voters in the election. In 2021 he was elected as the Dobropilsky mayor having gained 58% of voters in the election. On March 28, 2021 he was elected as a people's deputy at the intermediate by-elections to the Verkhovna Rada in the Donetsk region in the 50th district. The candidate for people's deputies from the "Poryadok" party. He is the member of the group of inter-parliamentary associations in Hungary and Germany. He lives in the village of Novodonetske.

With the support of People's Deputies of Ukraine Vadym Novynskyi, Musa Magomedov, Sergey Magerov, Viktoriya Grib. He is the Head of the Association of Mining Cities "Miner's Character". 

A memorandum was signed in 2021 between the Association of Coal Cities and a French company BETEN Ingenierie International.

Aksyonov's term as People's Deputy of Ukraine was terminated by parliament on 13 January 2023. Aksyonov voluntarily ended his mandate.

Personal life 
Aksyonov is married and has four children.

References 

1971 births
Living people
Donetsk National Technical University alumni
Ninth convocation members of the Verkhovna Rada